RTU Riga Business School (RBS) is a management education institution within Riga Technical University (RTU). It was established in 1991 in cooperation with Riga Technical University, the State University of New York at Buffalo (SUNY Buffalo) in the United States, and the University of Ottawa in Canada.

RBS was the first institution in the Baltics to offer MBA programs in English. Since 2012, Riga Business School has been offering a Bachelor of Management in International Business in collaboration with the BI Norwegian Business School. The school has more than 970 MBA graduates employed in managerial positions in Latvia and abroad. RBS offers an MBA curriculum featuring case studies and group work as well classroom work.

History

Riga Business School was founded in 1991 by Riga Technical University and SUNY Buffalo. RBS began a student exchange program with the University of Ottawa in 1992. In 1993, Riga Technical University, SUNY Buffalo, and the University of Ottawa formed a three-sided partnership and founded the RBS Language Center, the school's library, a computer class, and MBA courses with instructors from North America.

Program format

Master's in Business Administration
MBA classes are held on workdays from 6:00 pm to 9:00 pm and each semester students can register for one to four courses depending on course offer, suggested sequence and personal consideration. Choosing two courses each semester, the MBA can be completed in 2.5 years.

International students take four courses per semester. Students can choose one of four concentrations:
  Marketing
  Finance
  IT
  Generalist

Faculty
The faculty of RBS consists of both full-time and part-time professional local lecturers, as well as visiting professors from North America.

Diploma
RBS graduates receive an MBA degree that is accredited by the Republic of Latvia. They also receive a certificate from Riga Technical University, the State University of New York at Buffalo and the University of Ottawa.

Admission
Riga Business School has two admission periods: fall and spring. Students may start their studies in either September or January.

Admission criteria
 Four-year Bachelor’s degree or equivalent 
 TOEFL score (at least 550 for paper-based test or 80 for Internet-based test). IELTS score is also accepted (at least 6.5). Students are not obliged to certify their English proficiency if the previous degree is obtained in English speaking country or if English is their native language.
 Intellectual test (at least 50% correct answers) that measures logical and critical reasoning. GMAT score is also accepted.

Executive Master's in Business Administration

The Executive MBA (EMBA) is a management education program intended for senior-level managers and experienced professionals.

Program format

The studies are structured in 20 monthly modules with small groups. Students participate in a two-week study trip to SUNY Buffalo or the University of Ottawa. The trip includes both coursework and interaction with American executives and EMBA students.

Diploma

Upon graduation students receive an MBA degree from Riga Business School.

Admission
Admission procedure takes place in two periods: fall and spring. Students may start their studies in either September or January.

Admission criteria
 Four-year bachelor's or equivalent 
 At least five years of executive or senior-level management experience
 TOEFL score (at least 550 for paper-based test or 80 for Internet-based test). IELTS score is also accepted (at least 6.5). Students are not obliged to certify their English proficiency if the previous degree is obtained in English speaking country or if English is their native language.
 Structured interview

Bachelor's in Business Administration
The Bachelor of Business Administration (BBA) curriculum at Riga Business School is based on the curriculum of the BBA programs of BI Norwegian Business School and the SUNY Buffalo School of Management. The curriculum focuses on basic business related topics in Management, such as Finance, Economics, Methods, Law and Intercultural Communication. The program's language is English. Full-time students of the program attend for 3–4 years. Students can apply to the program through the common application.

Diploma
The program offers three options: 
 Study 3 years at RBS in Riga and get an internationally accredited BBA degree from the Riga Business School at Riga Technical University;
 Study 2 years at RBS in Riga, spend the 3rd in BI Norwegian Business School and get a dual degree diploma from RBS and BI; 
 Study 3 years at RBS in Riga, spend the 4th at SUNY Buffalo School of Management (UB) and get a dual degree diploma from RBS and SUNY Buffalo.

References

External links
Riga Technical University

Riga Technical University
Business schools in Latvia
Educational institutions established in 1991
1991 establishments in Latvia